The Xindian–Tai'an railway or Xintai railway is a railroad in northern China between Xindian, near Linzi, and Tai'an, in central Shandong Province. The line,  in length, was built from 1970 to 1974 and has 24 stations.  The line connects the Beijing–Shanghai and Jiaozhou–Jinan railways.

Rail connections
 Xindian (Linzi): Jiaozhou–Jinan railway
 Laiwu: Ciyao–Laiwu railway
 Tai'an: Beijing–Shanghai railway

See also

 List of railways in China

References

Railway lines in China
Rail transport in Shandong
Railway lines opened in 1974